Johnny McGowan (8 June 1920 – 30 March 2010) was a Republic of Ireland soccer international, who played with the Cork United team which dominated domestic Irish soccer in the 1940s. He also had a short spell in England with West Ham United.

He was also for many years a manager in the League of Ireland.

McGowan was a full back or centre half and was capped once for the Republic of Ireland at senior level in a 3–2 win over Spain in Dalymount Park on 2 March 1947.

References

External links
Profile from soccerscene.ie
Obituary FAI

Republic of Ireland association footballers
Republic of Ireland international footballers
1920 births
2010 deaths
Cork United F.C. (1940–1948) players
West Ham United F.C. players
Association football defenders